Originally produced by Minolta, and currently produced by Sony, the AF Fish-Eye 16mm, is a prime Fisheye lens compatible with cameras using the Minolta A-mount and Sony A-mount lens mounts.  It is a full-frame fisheye lens with a 180° viewing angle.

The front of the lens does not have a mount for filters.  Rather a number of filters are built in: Normal, 056, B12, and either FLW (in older versions) or A12 (in newer versions).  The filters are selected by a rotating dial on the body of the lens.

See also
 List of Minolta A-mount lenses

Sources
Dyxum lens data

External links
Sony: 16mm F2.8 Fisheye Lens

16
Fisheye lenses
Camera lenses introduced in 1986